The 1947 Baltimore Colts season was their inaugural season in the AAFC. In their first season as a franchise, they finished last in their division, winning only two games.

The team's statistical leaders included Bud Schwenk with 2,236 passing yards, Bus Mertes with 321 rushing yards, and Billy Hillenbrand with 702 receiving yards and 60 points scored.

Season schedule

Division standings

References

Baltimore Colts (1947–1950) seasons
Baltimore Colts